List of films produced in the Cinema of Poland. For an A-Z list of films currently covered on Wikipedia see Polish films.

Interwar
 List of films made in Poland in the Interwar Period

1902–1929
 List of Polish films pre 1930

1930s
 List of Polish films of the 1930s

1940s
 List of Polish films of the 1940s

1950s
 List of Polish films of the 1950s

1960s
 List of Polish films of the 1960s

1970s
 List of Polish films of the 1970s

1980s
 List of Polish films of the 1980s

1990s
 List of Polish films of the 1990s

2000s
 List of Polish films of the 2000s

2010s
 List of Polish films of the 2010s
 List of Polish films of 2014
 List of Polish films of 2015
 List of Polish films of 2016
 List of Polish films of 2017
 List of Polish films of 2018
 List of Polish films of 2019

2020s
 List of Polish films of the 2020s
 List of Polish films of 2020
 List of Polish films of 2021
 List of Polish films of 2022

See also
List of years in Poland
List of years in Polish television

External links
 Polish film at the Internet Movie Database